Homothecium is a genus of lichen-forming fungi in the family Pannariaceae.

References

Peltigerales
Lichen genera
Peltigerales genera
Taxa described in 1853
Taxa named by Abramo Bartolommeo Massalongo